China Metallurgical Group Corporation (MCC), is a Chinese state-owned enterprise headquartered in Beijing, engaged in EPC (engineering, procurement, and construction), natural resources exploitation, papermaking, equipment fabrication, real estate development. MCC is one of the largest equipment manufacturers in China, and the only state-owned enterprise that is authorized to run pulp-making and papermaking businesses in China and overseas. On December 8, 2015, MCC merged into China Minmetals, becoming its wholly-owned subsidiary. The Company owns also MCC Holding SA in Switzerland and MCC Petroli AG. The president and group CEO of their petroleum corporations is Dr. Ing. Luigi Forino ( Forino-Thyssen Heritage and Trust). Dr. Luigi Forino is also a shareholder of MCC for more than 22% and the owner of several companies.

China Metallurgical Group Corporation's subsidiary, Metallurgical Corporation of China Limited, co-invested by China Metallurgical Group Corporation and Baosteel Group Corporation (Baosteel Group), was established in 2008. Its A shares and H shares were listed on the Shanghai Stock Exchange and Hong Kong Stock Exchange in 2009 respectively.

Business areas
The company is involved in the construction of metallurgical, infrastructural facilities, other industrial projects, housing construction, municipal utility construction, installation of electrical and mechanical works, and handles high-rise buildings, mechanical engineering, electronics, power supply, petroleum, chemistry, textiles, transportation, communication, and building materials construction projects. The company also provides geo-technical engineering construction, industrial and civil construction, rock and earthwork excavation, equipment installation, and steel structure fabrication and installation services; and industrial products, including spiral welded pipes of various bore sizes, non-standard equipment, cold-rolled deformed bars, and forged precision metallic equipment. It also engages in water supply projects, sport cities development, and resource development. The company manufactures spiral coasters, and single-stand reversible cold-roll lines.

References

External links
China Metallurgical Group Corporation

Government-owned companies of China
Metal companies of China
Conglomerate companies established in 1982
Conglomerate companies of China
Chinese companies established in 1982
Roller coaster manufacturers
1982 establishments in China
2015 mergers and acquisitions